This page shows the results of the archery competition at the 2003 Pan American Games, held from August 1 to August 17, 2003 in Santo Domingo, Dominican Republic.

Men's competition

Recurve Individual

Recurve Team

Women's competition

Recurve Individual

Recurve Team

Medal table

See also
Archery at the 2004 Summer Olympics

References
 Sports 123
 cbc results

Pan American Games
2003
Events at the 2003 Pan American Games